Jackson Township is one of nine townships in Spencer County, Indiana. As of the 2010 census, its population was 891 and it contained 379 housing units.  Jackson Township contains the city of Gentryville.

History
Jackson Township was organized in 1841, and named for Andrew Jackson (1767–1845), the 7th President of the United States.

Colonel William Jones House was listed on the National Register of Historic Places in 1975.

Geography

Cities and towns

Gentryville

Unincorporated towns

Pigeon

References

External links
 Indiana Township Association
 United Township Association of Indiana

Townships in Spencer County, Indiana
Townships in Indiana
1841 establishments in Indiana